Cheltenham College is a public school (fee-charging boarding and day school for pupils aged 13–18) in Cheltenham, Gloucestershire, England. The school opened in 1841 as a Church of England foundation and is known for its outstanding classical, military, and sporting traditions.

History
Two Cheltenham residents, G. S. Harcourt and J. S. Iredell, founded Cheltenham College in July 1841 to educate the sons of gentlemen. It originally opened in three houses along Bays Hill Terrace in the centre of the town.

Within two years it had moved to its present site—with Boyne House as the first College Boarding House—and soon became known simply as Cheltenham College. Accepting both boarding and day boys, it was originally divided into Classical and Military sides until the mid-twentieth century. The 1893 book Great Public Schools by E. S. Skirving, S. R. James, and Henry Churchill Maxwell Lyte contained a chapter on each of what they considered England's ten greatest public schools; it included a chapter on Cheltenham College. It is now an independent fee paying school, governed by Cheltenham College Council. A few girls were admitted in 1969 and then in 1981 when the first girls' house opened, the Sixth Form became fully co educational. In 1998, girls were admitted to all other years, making the College fully co-educational.

In 1865, a Junior Department was added to the main College buildings. In 1993 it opened its doors to girls and also opened a pre-Prep department, Kingfishers, for 3- to 7-year-olds.

Work and service
In the First World War 702 Old Cheltonians (former pupils) were killed in the service of their country, and a further 363 died in World War II. Cheltenham's military past is recognised by the fact that it is one of only three schools in England (the others being Eton College, founded in 1440, and the Duke of York's Royal Military School, founded in 1803) to have its own military colours (last presented in 2000 by The Princess Royal). Queen Victoria School in Dunblane, Scotland, also has Colours.

The names of those Old Cheltonians killed in World War I are recorded in the College Chapel, completed in 1896, which to a degree resembles King's College Chapel, Cambridge and is one of the chapels of an English public school. The names of those killed in the World War II are displayed on the memorial in the College's dining hall.

Cheltenham has approximately 640 pupils (a fifth being day pupils) between the ages of 13 and 18. The fees are between approximately £31,000 - £43,000 per annum, making it amongst the most expensive schools in the United Kingdom. The school is now co-educational and maintains a strong academic reputation, with the majority of pupils going to The Russell Group Universities, and around 7% going on to Oxford and Cambridge universities. Both GCSE and A Level results are among the highest in Gloucestershire.

There is also a prep school, Cheltenham College Preparatory School, most of whose pupils go on to the senior school.

Cheltenham has links with the Wynberg Boys' High School in Cape Town, South Africa—an all-boys boarding school coincidentally established in 1841, the same year as Cheltenham.

Structure
Cheltenham College consists of a preparatory school and senior school and educates students from ages 3 to 18. The boarding programme is also available to preparatory school students. The school offers the following courses:
 Third Form (Students 13 to 14 years old)
 Fourth Form (GCSEs and IGCSEs)
 Fifth Form (GCSEs and IGCSEs)
 Sixth Form (Upper College) – Sixth Form students can choose two routes of study. The first route is to study three A Levels and complete an Extended Project Qualification (EPQ) and the second route is to study four A Levels.

Sport

Rugby
The Rugby club dates back to 1844. Cheltenham compete with larger single gender schools. The first inter-school rugby football match was played between Rugby School and Cheltenham College, Cheltenham beating Rugby; and the "Cheltenham Rules" were adopted by the Rugby Football Union in 1887.  Cheltenham's rugby XV was undefeated in the 1957, 2008 and 2017 seasons.
Eddie Butler, former Welsh, Babarian and British Lions International Rugby player, taught French at the school.
The schools Director of Rugby is former Gloucester Rugby and England Rugby player Olly Morgan.

Rowing
The Boat Club was founded in 1841. The Boat House itself is located at the foot of Tewkesbury Abbey on the banks of the River Severn. Key events in the rowing calendar are; Schools' Head of the River Race, The National Schools Regatta and Henley Royal Regatta. At the 2013 National School's Head of River, the 1st IV+ came first in their division.

Rackets
Cheltenham College plays Rackets where, at times, they have dominated the Queen's Club Public Schools Competition; Cheltenham has been National Champions three times from 2003 to 2011. Chris Stout won the Foster Cup (the individual championship for public schools) at Queen's Club in December 2011. The current World Champion, Jamie Stout (Chris's brother), is an Old Cheltonian as well.

Polo
Cheltenham were National Schools Champions in 1997, 1998, 2004, & 2005 and Arena Champions in 2004, 2005 & 2006.

Cricket
Cricket is one of the main sports that is played in summer. Cheltenham College enjoys a longstanding tradition of cricket and is the home of the  Cheltenham Cricket Festival. Gloucestershire County Cricket Club played its first game at the College cricket ground in 1872, making this the longest running cricket festival on an out-ground, in the world (Canterbury Cricket Week was first played in 1842, but the St Lawrence Ground is now Kent County Cricket Club's headquarters).

Houses 
There are eleven houses, two of which are day houses: Southwood for the boys and Queens for the girls. Ashmead, Chandos, College Lawn and Westal are the girls' boarding houses. The boys reside in Boyne House, Christowe, Hazelwell, Leconfield, and Newick House. Leconfield also hosts day students.

If....
Cheltenham College was used to film the majority of the school scenes in the popular 1968 British film If...., starring Malcolm McDowell, although an agreement between the school's then Headmaster, David Ashcroft, and the film's director, Lindsay Anderson (who was a former pupil and Senior Prefect), prevented the filmmakers from crediting the school. Additional interior scenes were filmed at Aldenham School in Hertfordshire, which gained sole accreditation in the film's closing credit. Two Surrey public schools, Charterhouse School and Cranleigh School, had also negotiated to appear, but pulled out of negotiations once the subject matter of the film became clear.

Old Cheltonians

Nobel Prize recipient
 Patrick White (1912–1990) – 1973 Literature laureate

Victoria Cross recipients
Fourteen Victoria Crosses (VCs) have been won by Old Cheltonians, with only Eton College (37), Harrow School (20), Haileybury College (17), and Wellington College (15), having higher totals.(Although it should be taken into account that the Duke of York's Royal Military School does not publish lists of recipients of bravery awards in order not to diminish the service of those several thousand former pupils who have fought in battle and not received the VC, but only lesser awards for gallantry).
The list of names, with age and rank at the time of the deed that merited the award of the VC, is as follows:
 Lieutenant Andrew Cathcart Bogle, 78th Regiment, Oonao, India, 29 July 1857, aged 28
 William Fraser McDonell, Bengal Civil Service, Arrah, India, 30 July 1857 aged 27
 Midshipman Duncan Gordon Boyes, HMS Euryalus, Japan, 6 September 1864, aged 17
 Captain George Nicolas Channer, 1st Gurkha Rifles, Perak Expedition, 20 December 1875, aged 32
 Lieutenant Teignmouth Melvill, 24th Regiment of Foot, Isandlwanha, Zululand, 22 January 1879, aged 36
 Lieutenant Reginald Clare Hart, Royal Engineers, Afghan War, 31 January 1879, aged 30 
 Lieutenant John Duncan Grant, 8th Gurkha Rifles, Gyantse Jong, Tibet Expedition, 6 July 1904 aged 27
 Captain Douglas Reynolds, Royal Field Artillery, Le Cateau, France, 26 August 1914, aged 31
 Lieutenant Philip Neame, Royal Engineers, Neuve Chapelle, France, aged 26
 Lieut. Commander Edward Courtney Boyle, Submarine E14, Sea of Marmara, Dardanelles, 27 April 1915, aged 32
 Second Lieut. George Raymond Dallas Moor, Hampshire Regiment, Krithia, Dardanelles, 5 June 1915, aged 18
 Lieutenant Colonel James Forbes-Robertson (34)
 Sergeant Frederick Charles Booth, 1st Rhodesian Native Regiment, Johannes Bruck, East Africa, 12 February 1917, aged 26
 Commander Robert Edward Dudley Ryder, RN, St Nazaire, 27 March 1942, aged 34

George Cross recipient
 André Gilbert Kempster (né Coccioletti). Royal Armoured Corps; Algeria, 21 August 1943

Sport
 Nick Abendanon (1986–)– England international rugby player
 Michael Baines (1898–1990) – First-class cricketer and British Army officer
 Henry Baird (1878–1950)– First-class cricketer and British Army officer
 Jonah Barrington (1941-) - 6 times British Open Squash Champion
 Tom Beim (1975–)– England rugby international
 Francis Brandt (1840–1925) – First-class cricketer
 Thomas Bramwell (1850–1924) – First-class cricketer
 James Brettell (1962–) – First-class cricketer
 George Brooksbank (1981–) – Sportsperson
 Jamie Chadwick (1998–) – Racing driver
 Neville Cohen (1913–1987) – First-class cricketer
 Simon Danielli (born 1979-) - Scottish rugby player
 Charles Garnett (1840–1919) – First-class cricketer
 Leslie Hancock (1899–1944) – First-class cricketer
 Allan Jay MBE (born 1931) – five-time-Olympian foil and épée fencer, and world champion.
 George Kennedy (1841–1869) – First-class cricketer
 Frank Kershaw (1879–1959) – First-class cricketer
 Reginald le Bas (1856–1938) – First-class cricketer
 Tom McEwan (1991-) - Olympic Silver and Team Gold Medalist Equestrian
 James Robertson (1844–1877) – First-class cricketer
 Chris Sandbach (born 1985—), cricketer
 Percival Sanger (1899—1968), first-class cricketer and an officer in both the British Army and the British Indian Army
 James Stout – Rackets World Champion
 Ollie Thorley (born 1996-) - Gloucester Rugby player
 Arthur Tyler (1907–1985) – First-class cricketer and British Army officer
 Geoffrey Wood (1891–1915) – cricketer

Notable former pupils in other fields
 Lieut.-Col. J. D. H. Stewart (1845-1884) - accompanied Charles George Gordon to Khartoum in 1884 and was killed leading the last Europeans out of Khartoum when their steamer ran aground. He was awarded the Order of St. Michael and St. George.
 Major-General Sir Colin Gubbins (1896-1976) - prime mover of the Special Operations Executive in the Second World War. He received the Military Cross and Distinguished Service Order.
 Lindsay Anderson (1923—1994) – film director
 Brigadier Charles Douglas Armstrong (1897—1985) – Head of the British Special Operations Executive liaison mission to the Chetniks in Yugoslavia, 1943-44
 Tim Bevan (1957–) – co-founder of Working Title Films
 Forde Everard de Wend Cayley (1915-2004) –  MD, RAMC, MBE, FRCP,  World War II POW camp survivor
 Houston Stewart Chamberlain, British-born philosopher and naturalised German citizen, highly influential in the pan-Germanic Völkisch movements of the early-20th century and later influenced the antisemitism of Nazi racial policy.
 Jack Davenport (born 1973), film and television actor
 Charles Eliot (1862—1931) – former British ambassador to Japan and the inaugural Vice-Chancellor of the University of Hong Kong
 Lieutenant General Sir John Fowler (1864-1939) - Commander of British Forces in China, 1922-1925
 Sir Wyndham Charles Knight (1863–1942), Indian Army general
 Sir Alan Haselhurst (1937–) – former Deputy Speaker & MP
 Adam Henson (1966–) – farmer and TV presenter
 Chris Hill (born 1971), businessman, CEO of Hargreaves Lansdown
 Hichamuddin Hussein (1961–) – Malaysian politician
 Lawrence Hugh Jenkins (1857–1928) – Chief Justice of Calcutta High Court and Bombay High Court
 Gavin Lambert (1924—2005), screenwriter, novelist and biographer
 Lieutenant Commander Mike Lithgow (1920–1963) – chief test pilot Vickers Supermarine and holder of absolute World Speed Record 1953
 Kenneth Mason (1887-1976), Himalayan explorer and first statutory Professor of Geography at Oxford University
 Philip Moore (1921-2009), The Lord Moore of Wolvercote, Private Secretary to Queen Elizabeth II from 1977 to 1986.
 Rageh Omaar (born 1967), ITV News correspondent and presenter, formerly with BBC News and Al Jazeera English
 Endicott Peabody (1857-1944) – American clergyman and founder of Groton School
 Alfred Pullman (1916–1954) – RAF Officer killed in Mau Mau Uprising
 Ivor Richard (1932—2018), Former Labour Cabinet minister, British Ambassador to the United Nations and Shadow Leader of the House of Lords.
 Michael Rose (1940-), Commander UNPROFOR Bosnia in 1994 during the Yugoslav Wars.
 W. H. D. Rouse (1863–1950) – British teacher who advocated the use of the Direct Method of teaching Latin and Greek
 Iain Sinclair (born 1943), poet, novelist, editor, filmmaker, publisher, playwright and book-dealer
 Mark Stone (born 1979) - Journalist / Foreign Correspondent
 Sirichalerm Svasti or Chef McDang (born 1953–) – Thai TV Celebrity Chef
 Hugh Verity (1918-2001) - RAF pilot, veteran of many night landings in wartime France for the SOE
 Prince Vivadhanajaya (1899–1960) – First Governor of the Bank of Thailand and Finance minister of Thailand
 Ts'o Seen Wan (1868–1953) — Founder of St Stephen’s College, Hong Kong
 Edward Wilson (1872—1912), physician, polar explorer, natural historian, painter and ornithologist
 Ken Yeang (1948—) – Architect

Principals, headmasters and head
The current head of Cheltenham College is Nicola Huggett.

The full list of past principals and heads is contained in Cheltenham College Who's Who 5th edition, 2003, and is as follows:

 Principals (1841–1919)
 
 Alfred Phillips, 1841–44
 William Dobson, 1845–59
 Henry Highton, 1859–62
 Alfred Barry, 1862–68
 Thomas Jex-Blake, 1868–74
 Herbert Kynaston (né Snow), 1874–88
 Herbert Armitage James, 1889–95
 Robert Stuart de Courcy Laffan, 1895–99
 Reginald Waterfield, 1899–1919
 Headmasters (1919–2019)
 Henry Harrison Hardy, 1919–32
 Richard Victor Harley Roseveare 1932–37
 Arthur Goodhart Pite 1937–38
 John Bell 1938–40
 Alan Guy Elliott-Smith 1940–51
 Guy Pentreath 1952–59
 David Ashcroft 1959–78
 Richard Martin Morgan 1978–90
 Peter David Vaughan Wilkes 1990–97
 Paul Arthur Chamberlain 1997–2004
 John Stephen Richardson 2004–2010
 Alex Peterken 2010–2018
 Crispin Dawson (acting headmaster – 2018)
 Head (2019- )
 Nicola Huggett 2019 –
 Heads of the Junior School (1863–2013)
 Thomas Middlemore Middlemore-Whithard 1863–65
 Francis Joseph Cade 1896–1910
 Charles Thornton 1911–23
 Basil Allcot Bowers 1923–33
 William Donavan Johnston 1933–46
 Hugh Alan Clutton-Brock 1946–64
 William Philip Cathcart Davies 1964–86
 David John Allenby Cassell 1986–91
 Nigel Iain Archdale 1992–2008
 Adrian Morris 2008–2010
 Scott Bryan 2010–2012
 Noll Jenkins 2012–2013 (acting head)
 Heads of the preparatory school (2013–present)
 Jonathan Whybrow 2013–2018
 Tom O'Sullivan 2018 –

See also
 Cheltonian Society
 College Ground, Cheltenham
 Thirlestaine House
 List of people educated at Cheltenham College

References

Bibliography
 Cheltenham College: The First Hundred Years by Michael C. Morgan [Chalfont St. Giles: Richard Sadler, for the Cheltonian Society, 1968]. A formal history, starting with the meeting on 9 November 1840 of Cheltenham residents (presided over by Major-General George Swiney) who decided to set up a 'Proprietary Grammar School' and appointed a committee to achieve this. ISBN unknown/unavailable.
 Then & Now: An Anniversary Celebration of Cheltenham College 1841–1991 by Tim Pearce, (Cheltonian Society, 1991). The author explains in the Preface that this is "more of a scrap book than a formal history, and like all scrap books it reflects the tastes and interests of its compilers and depends on what in the way of pictures and documents may be available to them".  
 Cheltenham College Who's Who, 5th edition ed. John Bowes, (Cheltonian Society, 2003) No ISBN on book.
 Floreat, A collection of photographs of College life from the 1960s and early 1970s compiled by the late M.F. Miller, a Physics master at the school

External links 

 Cheltenham College website

Cheltenham College
Educational institutions established in 1841
1841 establishments in England
Boarding schools in Gloucestershire
Private schools in Gloucestershire
Schools in Cheltenham
Member schools of the Headmasters' and Headmistresses' Conference
Racquets venues
Schools cricket